Johannes Vogel may refer to:

 Johannes Vogel (botanist) (born 1963), German botanist
 Johannes Vogel (politician) (born 1982), German politician
 Johannes Gijsbert Vogel (1828–1915), Dutch landscape painter